Fregula (often written fregola) is a type of pasta from Sardinia. It is similar to North African Berkoukes, Levantine Moghrabieh, and Israeli couscous. Fregula comes in varying sizes, but typically consists of semolina dough that has been rolled into balls 2–3 mm in diameter and toasted in an oven.

A typical preparation of fregula is to simmer it in a tomato-based sauce with clams.

References

Types of pasta